Douglas Seneca Gjertsen (born July 31, 1967) is an American former competition swimmer, Olympic champion, and former world record-holder.

Gjertsen was the third member of the record-setting U.S. team in the men's 4×200-meter freestyle relay at the 1988 Summer Olympics in Seoul, South Korea.  The American team of Troy Dalbey, Matt Cetlinski, Gjertsen and Matt Biondi set a new world record with a time of 7:12.51.  He also received a bronze medal for swimming for the third-place U.S. team in the preliminary heats of the men's 4×100-meter freestyle relay.

Four years later at the 1992 Summer Olympics in Barcelona, Spain, he was the fourth member of the third-place U.S. team in the men's 4×200-meter freestyle relay; the American team of Joe Hudepohl, Mel Stewart, Jon Olsen and Gjertsen won the bronze medal with a time of 7:16.23.  Individually, he finished eighth in the final of the men's 200-meter freestyle, recording a time of 1:50.57.

He attended the University of Texas at Austin, and swam for coach Eddie Reese's Texas Longhorns swimming and diving team.  He was a three-time individual NCAA champion and a nine-time relay NCAA champion.  He was inducted into the Longhorn Hall of Honor in September 2006.

Gjertsen is formerly the head coach of SwimAtlanta and is currently the head coach for Alamo Area Aquatics Association in San Antonio, Texas.  He has served as the personal coach for one of the best Latvian swimmers, Andrejs Duda. He currently serves as the personal coach for former American record holder Amanda Weir.

Gjertsen has been instrumental in the orchestration of the Atlanta Swim Across America event which he helped kickstart in 2015. Since 2015, the Atlanta event has raised over $3 million for cancer research, treatment, and development.

See also
 List of Olympic medalists in swimming (men)
 List of University of Texas at Austin alumni
 List of World Aquatics Championships medalists in swimming (men)
 World record progression 4 × 200 metres freestyle relay

References

1969 births
Living people
American male freestyle swimmers
American swimming coaches
World record setters in swimming
Olympic bronze medalists for the United States in swimming
Olympic gold medalists for the United States in swimming
Sportspeople from Warren County, New Jersey
Swimmers at the 1988 Summer Olympics
Swimmers at the 1992 Summer Olympics
Texas Longhorns men's swimmers
World Aquatics Championships medalists in swimming
Swimmers from New Jersey
Medalists at the 1988 Summer Olympics
Dunwoody High School alumni